The Tougher They Come is a 1950 American lumberjack drama film directed by Ray Nazarro and written by George Bricker. The film stars Wayne Morris, Preston Foster, Kay Buckley, William Bishop, Frank McHugh and Gloria Henry. The film was released on November 16, 1950, by Columbia Pictures.

Plot

Cast           
Wayne Morris as Bill Shaw
Preston Foster as Joe MacKinley
Kay Buckley as Helen MacKinley
William Bishop as Gus Williams
Frank McHugh as Gig Rafferty
Gloria Henry as Rattle Rafferty
Mary Castle as Flo
Joseph Crehan as Thompson
Frank O'Connor as Mike Shepard
Al Thompson as Tom
Alan Bridge as Jensen

References

External links
 

1950 films
1950s English-language films
American drama films
1950 drama films
Columbia Pictures films
Films directed by Ray Nazarro
Films set in forests
Films about lumberjacks
American black-and-white films
1950s American films